Joseph Hibbert was a textile machinery manufacturer from Darwen, Lancashire in UK. The Iron, Brass and Copper Works was in Bridge Street.

History
Joseph Hibbert was a brass founder and maker of gauges and taps. These skills were used to produce heald sizing  equipment, including the Shirley box sizer under licence. Sizing was an essential part of the weaving process for cotton. The warp had to be stiffened before it passed through the heald, This was done by coating it with size. After weaving the size had to be removed.

In the recession of the 1930s, Platt Brothers, Howard and Bullough, Brooks and Doxey, Asa Lees, Dobson and Barlow, Joseph Hibbert, John Hetherington and Tweedales and Smalley merged to become  Textile Machinery Makers Ltd., but the individual units continued to trade under their own names until the 1970, when they were rationalised into one company called Platt UK Ltd. In 1991 the company name changed to Platt Saco Lowell.

References

External links 

Companies based in Lancashire
Textile machinery manufacturers
Defunct manufacturing companies of the United Kingdom